Sambalpur (Sl. No.: 17) is a Vidhan Sabha constituency of Sambalpur district, Odisha, India.
This constituency includes Sambalpur, Hirakud and Burla.

Elected Members

Sixteen elections held during 1951 to 2019. List of members elected from this constituency are:
 2019 (17): Jayanarayan Mishra (BJP)
 2014 (17): Raseswari Panigrahi (BJD)
 2009 (17): Jayanarayan Mishra (BJP)
 2004 (128): Jayanarayan Mishra (BJP)
 2000 (128): Jayanarayan Mishra (BJP)
 1995 (128): Durga Shankar Pattnaik (Congress)
 1990 (128): Durga Shankar Patnaik (Congress)
 1985 (128): Shraddhakar Supakar (Congress)
 1980 (128): Aswini Ku. Guru (Congress-I)
 1977 (128): Jhasketan Sahu (Janata Party)
 1974 (128): Sriballav Panigrahi (Congress)
 1971 (114): Sriballav Panigrahi (Swatantra Party)
 1967 (114): Banamali Babu (Congress)
 1961 (55): Banamali Babu (Congress)
 1957 (38): Bhikari Ghasi (Ganatantra Parishad), Laxmi Prasad Mishra (Gana Parishad)
 1951 (33): Bhikari Ghasi (Ganatantra Parishad)

2019 Election Result
In 2019 election Bharatiya Janata Party candidate Jayanarayan Mishra, defeated Biju Janata Dal candidate Reseswari Panigrahi  by a margin of 4,380 votes.

2014 Election Result
In 2014 election Biju Janata Dal candidate Reseswari Panigrahi, defeated Bharatiya Janata Party candidate Jayanarayan Mishra by a margin of 9,958 votes.

2009 Election Result
In 2009 election Bharatiya Janata Party candidate Jayanarayan Mishra, defeated  Indian National Congress candidate Sureswar Mishra by a margin of 7,010 votes.

Notes

References

Sambalpur district
Assembly constituencies of Odisha